The Oregon School Activities Association (OSAA) is a non-profit, board-governed organization that regulates high school athletics and competitive activities via athletic conferences in the U.S. state of Oregon, providing equitable competition among its members, both public and private. The OSAA is based in Wilsonville.

History

Originally created in 1918 as the "Oregon State High School Athletic Association", the name changed to the "Oregon School Activities Association", or OSAA, in 1947.

Currently, the OSAA sponsors seventy-four state championships in nineteen interscholastic activities including athletics, music, and forensics and is a member of the National Federation of State High School Associations.

Starting in the 2006–07 school year, the organization's four school classifications (1A, 2A, 3A, 4A) were divided into six classifications (6A, 5A, 4A, 3A, 2A, 1A). This caused some controversy as some school districts complained about the new classifications and sought legal action. OSAA voted to keep a six classification system in 2017.

Classifications and leagues
The OSAA divides schools up into classifications and leagues (or conferences).

There are six classifications, with the smallest schools in class 1A and the largest schools in class 6A.  Within each classification, there are between five and eight leagues and conferences.  Each league or conference has between four and 15 schools. Prior to 2006, there were four classifications (4A, 3A, 2A, 1A), prior to 1990, there were four classifications (AAA, AA, A, B), and prior to 1970, there were either three or four classifications (depending on the sport), but they were designated as A, A-2, B, B-8 for football, A-1, A-2 and B in basketball and A, A-2, & B for baseball.

According to OSAA's classification system for 2022-26, a 1A school has fewer than 74 students, 2A between 75 and 145 students, 3A between 146 and 310 students, 4A between 311 and 607 students, 5A between 608 and 1004 students, and the largest schools, 6A, have 1005 or more students. However, some schools choose to "play up" in a larger classification than they would normally be assigned.

As of the 2022-23 season, OSAA's classifications comprise the following:

6A classification

6A-1: Portland Interscholastic League 
Benson Techmen (No football)
Cleveland Warriors 
Franklin Lightning
Grant Generals
Jefferson Democrats
Lincoln Cardinals
McDaniel Mountain Lions
Roosevelt Roughriders
Wells Guardians

6A-2: Metro League
Aloha Warriors
Beaverton Beavers
Jesuit Crusaders (private)
Mountainside Mavericks
Southridge Skyhawks 
Sunset Apollos
Westview Wildcats

6A-3: Pacific Conference
Century Jaguars
Forest Grove Vikings 
Glencoe Crimson Tide
Liberty Falcons
McMinnville Grizzlies
Newberg Tigers
Sherwood Bowmen

6A-4: Mt. Hood Conference
Barlow Bruins
Central Catholic Rams (private)
Clackamas Cavaliers
David Douglas Scots
Gresham Gophers
 Nelson Hawks
Reynolds Raiders
Sandy Pioneers

6A-5: Three Rivers League
Lake Oswego Lakers
Lakeridge Pacers
Oregon City Pioneers
St. Mary's Academy Blues (private, girls only)
Tigard Tigers
Tualatin Timberwolves
West Linn Lions

6A-6: Central Valley Conference
McNary Celtics
North Salem Vikings 
South Salem Saxons 
Sprague Olympians 
West Salem Titans

6A-7: Southwest Conference
Grants Pass Cavemen
North Medford Black Tornado 
Roseburg Indians 
Sheldon Irish 
South Eugene Axe 
South Medford Panthers 
Willamette Wolverines

5A classification

5A-1: Northwest Oregon Conference
Canby Cougars 
Centennial Eagles 
Hillsboro Spartans
Hood River Valley Eagles 
La Salle Falcons (private)
Milwaukie Mustangs 
Parkrose Broncos 
Rex Putnam Kingsmen
Wilsonville Wildcats

5A-2: Midwestern League
Ashland Grizzlies 
Churchill Lancers
Crater Comets
Eagle Point Eagles
North Eugene Highlanders
Springfield Millers
Thurston Colts

5A-3: Mid-Willamette Conference
Central Panthers
Corvallis Spartans
Crescent Valley Raiders
Dallas Dragons
Lebanon Warriors
McKay Scots
Silverton Foxes
South Albany Red Hawks
West Albany Bulldogs
Woodburn Bulldogs

5A-4: Intermountain Conference
Bend Lava Bears 
Caldera Wolfpack
Mountain View Cougars
Redmond Panthers
Ridgeview Ravens 
Summit Storm

4A classification

4A-1: Cowapa League
Astoria Fishermen
Scappoose Indians
Seaside Seagulls
St. Helens Lions
Tillamook Cheesemakers

4A-2: Tri-Valley Conference  
Crook County Cowboys
Estacada Rangers
Gladstone Gladiators
Madras White Buffaloes
Molalla Indians
The Dalles Riverhawks

4A-3: Oregon West Conference
Cascade Cougars
Newport Cubs
North Marion Huskies
Philomath Warriors
Stayton Eagles
Sweet Home Huskies

4A-4: Sky-Em League
Cottage Grove Lions
Junction City Tigers
Marist Catholic Spartans (private)
Marshfield Pirates
North Bend Bulldogs

4A-5: Skyline Conference
Henley Hornets
Hidden Valley Mustangs
Klamath Union Pelicans
Mazama Vikings
Phoenix Pirates

4A-6: Greater Oregon League
Baker Bulldogs
Crook County Cowboys
La Grande Tigers
Madras White Buffaloes
Pendleton Buckaroos

3A classification

3A-1: Lewis & Clark League
Catlin Gabel Eagles (private)
De La Salle North Catholic Knights (private)
Horizon Christian Hawks (private)
Oregon Episcopal Aardvarks (private)
Portland Adventist Academy Cougars (private)
Valley Catholic Valiants (private)
Westside Christian Eagles (private)

3A-2: Coastal Range League
Banks Braves
Corbett Cardinals
Neah-Kah-Nie Pirates
Rainier Columbians
Riverdale Mavericks
Warrenton Warriors
Yamhill-Carlton Tigers

3A-3: PacWest Conference
Amity Warriors
Dayton Pirates
Jefferson Lions
Santiam Christian Eagles (private)
Scio Loggers
Sheridan Spartans
Taft Tigers

3A-4: Mountain Valley Conference
Creswell Bulldogs
Elmira Falcons
Harrisburg Eagles
La Pine Hawks
Pleasant Hill Billies
Sisters Outlaws
Siuslaw Vikings

3A-5: Far West League
Brookings-Harbor Bruins
Cascade Christian Challengers (private)
Coquille Red Devils
Douglas Trojans
Glide Wildcats
Lakeview Honkers
North Valley Knights
Rogue River Chieftains
South Umpqua Lancers
St. Mary's Crusaders (private)
Sutherlin Bulldogs

3A-6: Eastern Oregon League
Burns Hillanders
McLoughlin Pioneers
Nyssa Bulldogs
Riverside Pirates
Umatilla Vikings
Vale Vikings

2A classification

2A-1: Northwest League
Clatskanie Tigers
Faith Bible Falcons (private)
Gaston Greyhounds
Knappa Loggers
Mannahouse Christian Academy Lions (private)
Nestucca Bobcats
Portland Christian Royals (private)
Vernonia Loggers

2A-2: Tri-River Conference
Blanchet Catholic Cavaliers (private)
Chemawa Braves
Colton Vikings
Culver Bulldogs
Delphian School Dragons (private)
Gervais Cougars
Kennedy Trojans
Regis Rams (private)
Salem Academy Crusaders (private)
Santiam Wolverines
Western Christian Pioneers (private)
Willamina Bulldogs

2A-3: Central Valley Conference
Bandon Tigers
Central Linn Cobras
East Linn Christian Academy Eagles (private)
Gold Beach Panthers
Illinois Valley Cougars
Lowell Devils
Monroe Dragons
Oakland Oakers
Oakridge Warriors
Reedsport Braves 
Toledo Boomers
Waldport Irish

2A-6: Blue Mountain Conference
Enterprise Outlaws
Grant Union Prospectors
Heppner Mustangs
Irrigon Knights
Stanfield Tigers
Weston-McEwen Tiger Scots

1A classification

1A-1: The Valley 10 League
Columbia Christian Knights (private)
Country Christian Cougars (private)
Damascus Christian Eagles (private)
Grand View Christian Huskies (private)
North Clackamas Christian Saints (private)
Open Door Christian Huskies (private)
Southwest Christian Wildcats (private)
St. Stephen's Archers (private)
Trinity Academy Thunder (private)
Valor Christian Knights (private)

1A-2: Casco League
C. S. Lewis Watchmen (private)
Crosshill Christian Eagles (private)
Falls City Mountaineers
Jewell Bluejays
Livingstone Lions (private)
Oregon School for the Deaf Panthers 
Perrydale Pirates
St. Paul Buckaroos
Veritas Vanguard (private)
Willamette Valley Christian Warriors (private)

1A-3: Mountain West League
Alsea Wolverines
Crow Cougars
Eddyville Charter Eagles
Kings Valley Eagles
Mapleton Sailors
Mannahouse Christian Academy Lions (private)
McKenzie Eagles
Mohawk Mustangs
Oak Hill School Falcons (private)
Siletz Valley Warriors
Triangle Lake Lakers

1A-4: Skyline League
Camas Valley Hornets
Days Creek Wolves
Elkton Elks
Glendale Pirates
Milo Adventist Mustangs
Myrtle Point Bobcats
New Hope Christian Warriors (private)
North Douglas Warriors
Pacific Pirates
Powers Cruisers
Riddle Irish
Umpqua Valley Christian Monarchs (private)
Yoncalla Eagles

1A-5: Mountain Valley League
Bonanza Antlers
Butte Falls Loggers
Cascades Academy Steelhead (private)
Central Christian Tigers (private)
Chiloquin Panthers
Crosspoint Christian Warriors (private)
Gilchrist Grizzlies
Lost River Raiders
North Lake Cowboys
Paisley Broncos
Prospect Cougars
Rogue Valley Adventist Red Tail Hawks (private)
Trinity Lutheran Saints (private)

1A-6: Big Sky League
Arlington Honkers
Bickleton Pirates
Condon Blue Devils
Dufur Rangers
Glenwood Eagles
Horizon Christian Hawks (private)
Ione Cardinals
Klickitat Vandals
Lyle Cougars
Mitchell Loggers
Sherman Huskies
South Wasco County Redsides
Spray Eagles
Trout Lake Mustangs
Wheeler Falcons
Wishram Indians

1A-7: Old Oregon League
Cove Leopards
Echo Cougars
Elgin Huskies
Griswold Grizzles
Imbler Panthers
Joseph Eagles
Nixyaawii Golden Eagles 
Pilot Rock Rockets
Pine Eagle Spartans
Powder Valley Badgers
Union Bobcats
Wallowa Cougars

1A-8: High Desert League
Adrian Antelopes
Burnt River Bulls
Crane Mustangs
Dayville Tigers
Four Rivers Falcons
Harper Hornets
Huntington Locomotives
Jordan Valley Mustangs
Long Creek Mountaineers
Monument Tigers
Prairie City Panthers
Ukiah Cougars

Former members 
Hermiston High School - moved to the Washington Interscholastic Activities Association to compete in the Columbia Basin Conference, which consists of schools in Tri-Cities, Washington

Football Classifications 

Schools often compete in different divisions for football; in other sports, conferences are constructed to aim to preserve historic rivalries, regardless of current enrollment. As of the 2022-23 season, OSAA's classifications comprise the following:

6A classification

6A-1: Portland Interscholastic League 

Cleveland Warriors 
Franklin Lightning
Grant Generals
Jefferson Democrats
Lincoln Cardinals
McDaniel Mountain Lions
Roosevelt Roughriders
Wells Guardians

6A-2: Metro League
Aloha Warriors
Beaverton Beavers
Jesuit Crusaders (private)
Mountainside Mavericks
Sunset Apollos
Westview Wildcats

6A-3: Pacific Conference
Century Jaguars
Glencoe Crimson Tide
Liberty Falcons
McMinnville Grizzlies
Newberg Tigers
Sherwood Bowmen

6A-4: Mt. Hood Conference
Barlow Bruins
Central Catholic Rams (private)
Clackamas Cavaliers
David Douglas Scots
Gresham Gophers
Nelson Hawks
Reynolds Raiders
Sandy Pioneers

6A-5: Three Rivers League
Lake Oswego Lakers
Lakeridge Pacers
Oregon City Pioneers
Tigard Tigers
Tualatin Timberwolves
West Linn Lions

6A-6: Central/Southwest Valley Conference
Grants Pass Cavemen 
McNary Celtics 
North Medford Black Tornado 
North Salem Vikings 
Roseburg Indians 
Sheldon Irish 
South Medford Panthers 
South Salem Saxons 
Sprague Olympians
West Salem Titans

5A classification

5A-3: Mid-Willamette Conference
Central Panthers
Corvallis Spartans
Crescent Valley Raiders
Dallas Dragons
Lebanon Warriors
McKay Scots
Silverton Foxes
South Albany Red Hawks
West Albany Bulldogs

5A-4: Intermountain Conference
Bend Lava Bears 
Caldera Wolfpack
Mountain View Cougars
Redmond Panthers
Ridgeview Ravens 
Summit Storm

5A-SD1: Special District 1
Canby Cougars 
Centennial Eagles 
Forest Grove Vikings (6A)
Hillsboro Spartans
Hood River Valley Eagles  
Rex Putnam Kingsmen
Southridge Skyhawks (6A)
Wilsonville Wildcats

5A-SD2: Special District 2
Churchill Lancers
Crater Comets
Eagle Point Eagles
North Eugene Highlanders
South Eugene Axe (6A)
Springfield Millers
Thurston Colts
Willamette Wolverines

4A classification

4A-SD1: Special District 1
Astoria Fishermen
Milwaukie Mustangs (5A)
Scappoose Indians
Seaside Seagulls
St. Helens Lions
Tillamook Cheesemakers

4A-SD2: Special District 2  
Estacada Rangers
Gladstone Gladiators
La Salle Falcons (private)
Molalla Indians
Parkrose Broncos 
Woodburn Bulldogs

4A-SD3: Special District 3
Cascade Cougars
Cottage Grove Lions
Junction City Tigers
Marist Catholic Spartans (private)
Philomath Warriors
Stayton Eagles
Sweet Home Huskies

4A-SD4: Special District
Ashland Grizzlies (5A)
Henley Hornets
Hidden Valley Mustangs
Klamath Union Pelicans
Marshfield Pirates
Mazama Vikings
North Bend Bulldogs

4A-SD5: Special District 5
Baker Bulldogs
La Grande Tigers
Ontario Tigers
Pendleton Buckaroos

3A classification

3A-SD1: Special District
Banks Braves
Corbett Cardinals
North Marion Huskies (4A)
Rainier Columbians
Valley Catholic Valiants (private)
Warrenton Warriors
Yamhill-Carlton Tigers

3A-SD2: Special District 2
Amity Warriors
Dayton Pirates
Jefferson Lions
Kennedy Trojans (2A)
Newport Cubs (4A)
Salem Academy Crusaders (private, 2A)
Santiam Christian Eagles (private)
Scio Loggers

3A-SD3: Special District 3
Brookings-Harbor Bruins
Cascade Christian Challengers (Private)
Coquille Red Devils
Douglas Trojans
Lakeview Honkers
North Valley Knights
Phoenix Pirates (4A)
South Umpqua Lancers
St. Mary's Crusaders (Private)
Sutherlin Bulldogs

3A-4: Mountain Valley Conference
Creswell Bulldogs
Elmira Falcons
Harrisburg Eagles
La Pine Hawks
Pleasant Hill Billies
Sisters Outlaws
Siuslaw Vikings

3A-SD4: Special District 4
Burns Hillanders
McLoughlin Pioneers
Nyssa Bulldogs
Ontario Tigers (4A)
Vale Vikings

2A classification

2A-2: Tri-River Conference
Blanchet Catholic Cavaliers (private)
Chemawa Braves
Colton Vikings
Culver Bulldogs
Gervais Cougars
Regis Rams (private)
Santiam Wolverines
Willamina Bulldogs

2A-SD1: Special District 1
Clatskanie Tigers
Gaston Greyhounds
Knappa Loggers
Neah-Kah-Nie Pirates (3A)
Nestucca Bobcats
Portland Christian Royals (private)
Sheridan Spartans (3A)
Vernonia Loggers

2A-SD2: Special District 2
Central Linn Cobras
Lowell Devils
Monroe Dragons
Oakridge Warriors
Taft Tigers
Toledo Boomers
Waldport Irish

2A-SD3: Special District 3
Bandon Tigers
Glide Wildcats (3A)
Gold Beach Panthers
Illinois Valley Cougars
North Douglas Warriors (1A)
Oakland Oakers
Reedsport Braves 
Rogue River Chieftains (3A)
Yoncalla Eagles (1A)

2A-SD4: Special District 4
Grant Union Prospectors
Heppner Mustangs
Irrigon Knights
Riverside Pirates (3A)
Stanfield Tigers
Umatilla Vikings (3A)
Weston-McEwen Tiger Scots

1A classification, 8-man football

1A[8]-SD1: Special District 1
Alsea Wolverines
Bonanza Antlers
Butte Falls Loggers
Camas Valley Hornets
Chiloquin Panthers
Crosspoint Christian Warriors (private)
Falls City Mountaineers
Kings Valley Eagles
Lost River Raiders
Mohawk Mustangs
Myrtle Point Bobcats
Perrydale Pirates
Prospect Cougars
St. Paul Buckaroos

1A[8]-SD2-E: Special District 2, East
Adrian Antelopes
Cove Leopards
Elgin Huskies
Imbler Panthers
Pilot Rock Rockets
Powder Valley Badgers
Union Bobcats
Wallowa Cougars

1A[8]-SD2-W: Special District 2, West
Arlington Honkers
Condon Blue Devils
Crane Mustangs
Dufur Rangers
Enterprise Outlaws (2A)
Ione Cardinals
Klickitat Vandals
Lyle Cougars
Sherman Huskies
Wishram Indians

1A classification, 6-man football

1A[6]-SD1: Special District 1
Burnt River Bulls
Dayville Tigers
Echo Cougars
Harper Hornets
Huntington Locomotives
Joseph Eagles
Mitchell Loggers
Monument Tigers
Pine Eagle Spartans
Prairie City Panthers
South Wasco County Redsides
Spray Eagles
Wheeler Falcons

1A[6]-SD2-N: Special District 2, North

Crow Cougars
Eddyville Charter Eagles
Jewell Bluejays
Mapleton Sailors
McKenzie Eagles
Siletz Valley Warriors
Triangle Lake Lakers

1A[6]-SD2-S: Special District 2, South

Days Creek Wolves
Elkton Elks
Gilchrist Grizzlies
Glendale Pirates
North Lake Cowboys
Powers Cruisers
Riddle Irish

Historic conferences made defunct by 2006 reclassification
4A Southern Oregon Conference : The final year of the Southern Oregon Conference consisted of South Medford, North Medford, Klamath Union, Eagle Point, Ashland, Crater, Grants Pass and Roseburg. This league was for 4A schools located near the Oregon-California border.

3A Tri-Valley Conference: The final year of the Tri-Valley Conference consisted of La Salle High School (Milwaukie, Oregon), Madras High School, Valley Catholic High School (Beaverton, Oregon), Estacada High School, Sherwood High School, and Wilsonville High School.  This league was for 3A sized schools located in or near the Portland-Metro area. The Tri-Valley conference is currently active once again as of the 2009 season.  It is a 4A Conference for schools located in the Portland-Metro Area.

2A Columbia Basin Conference:  The final year of the Columbia Basin Conference consisted of Culver High School, Heppner Junior/Senior High School, Pilot Rock High School, Sherman High School, Stanfield High School, Umatilla High School, and Weston-McEwen High School.  This league was for 2A sized schools located in central-eastern Oregon.

2A Trico League: The final year of the Trico League consisted of East Linn Christian Academy (Lebanon, Oregon), Harrisburg High School, Jefferson High School, Waldport High School, Monroe High School, Central Linn High School, and Oakridge High School.  This league was for 2A sized schools located in the central Willamette Valley.

2A Wapiti League:  The final year of the Wapiti League consisted of Grant Union High School, Vale High School, Nyssa High School, Elgin High School, Enterprise High School, and Union High School.  This League was for 2A sized schools located in far-eastern Oregon.

OSAA-sanctioned activities
The OSAA oversees the following activities:

See also
List of high schools in Oregon

References

External links

High school sports associations in the United States
High school sports in Oregon
Sports organizations established in 1918
Wilsonville, Oregon
1918 establishments in Oregon